Melaleuca leptospermoides is a plant in the myrtle family, Myrtaceae and is endemic to a small area in the south-west of Western Australia. It is an erect shrub with narrow leaves, pinkish or purple flowers and small fruit, and is similar to Melaleuca tuberculata except that it lacks brown bracts at the base of the flowers.

Description 

Purple, mauve, magenta or pink flowers appear in heads at or near the ends of the branches. The stamens are arranged in five bundles around the flower, each bundle having 8 to 12 stamens.

Taxonomy and naming
This species was first formally described in 1844 by Johannes Conrad Schauer in Plantae Preissianae. The specific epithet (leptospermoides) refers to the similarity of this species to a leptospermum.

Distribution and habitat
Melaleuca leptospermoides occurs from the Cadoux-Brookton districts eastwards to the Coolgardie-Lake King districts in the Avon Wheatbelt, Jarrah Forest and Mallee biogeographic regions. It grows in sand, gravel or clay on undulating sandplains and salt lakes.

Conservation status
Melaleuca leptospermoides is listed as "not threatened" by the Government of Western Australia Department of Parks and Wildlife.

Uses

Essential oils
The oil from the leaves of this species consists mainly of monoterpenes at the rate of 0.2-0.5% (fresh weight/weight).

References

leptospermoides
Myrtales of Australia
Rosids of Western Australia
Plants described in 1844
Endemic flora of Western Australia
Taxa named by Johannes Conrad Schauer